Mack is a census-designated place (CDP) in Green and Miami townships, Hamilton County, Ohio, United States. The population was 11,088 at the 2020 census. At prior censuses, the community was listed as two separate CDPs, Mack North and Mack South.

History
Mack was originally known as Dry Ridge in the 19th century. Andrew Mack was a local politician.

Geography
Ohio State Route 264 (Bridgetown Road) is the main road through the community, running east into Bridgetown and west to Cleves. Its neighbors are Bridgetown to the east, Covedale to the southeast, Delhi Township to the south, Addyston to the southwest, and North Bend and Miami Heights to the west.

Education
Oak Hills School District operates public schools. Springmyer Elementary School and John F. Dulles Elementary School are in Mack.

Public Library of Cincinnati and Hamilton County operates the Green Township Branch in Mack. The branch, which opened in January 1990, has a central copper dome with two smaller domed structures, which were designed to resemble the barns of horse farms which at one time were prevalent in Green Township.

References

Census-designated places in Hamilton County, Ohio
Census-designated places in Ohio